Florence High School is the high school for the town of Florence, Arizona. It is administered by the Florence Unified School District.

History
Its current front building opened in 1916. It was designed by Lescher & Kibbey, Phoenix architects who "dominated the design of educational buildings in Arizona". The Neoclassical Revival structure incorporates elements of the Spanish Revival style popular in the region. A one-story design was chosen, as many students would have traveled several miles on foot or on horseback. The building's orientation helped to keep temperature in the rooms, cooling in the summer and heating in the winter. In addition, the area under the front arches once featured windows and doors that opened at the front and back of the auditorium, creating a cooling cross breeze.

The front building was listed on the National Register of Historic Places on June 22, 1987, for its architecture, as well as for its significance as "a well-preserved example of institutional architecture in the early statehood period of Arizona history".
The original central entry was filled in, leaving nothing behind the arches. This was the case at the time of the NRHP nomination of this building in the Florence MRA. Since then, a central entry with windows and doors has been restored.

References

Schools in Pinal County, Arizona
School buildings completed in 1916
Neoclassical architecture in Arizona
School buildings on the National Register of Historic Places in Arizona
Public high schools in Arizona
National Register of Historic Places in Pinal County, Arizona
Florence, Arizona
International Baccalaureate schools in Arizona
1916 establishments in Arizona